Goulmima  is a town in Morocco situated in the province of Errachidia, in the region of Drâa-Tafilalet. An agricultural oasis, it is fed by the Wadi Gheris from the central High Atlas mountains. Like other settlements in Tafilalet, it was built as a fortified village or ksar. One of the most important ones,  (Ksar Goulmima), is in the process of restoration. Not just a historical location, several hundred people still live in the ksar.

Notable People
Abdelhamid Sabiri, Professional footballer

References

External links
  Ksour du Gheris
  goulmima.com
  Arraw n'Ghriss

Berber populated places
Berbers in Morocco
Ksars
Populated places in Errachidia Province